Presidential elections were held in Mongolia on 6 June 1993, the first time a president had been publicly elected. The result was a victory for Punsalmaagiin Ochirbat, who won 59.9% of the vote. Voter turnout was 92.7%.

Results

References

Mongolia
1993 in Mongolia
Presidential elections in Mongolia